The Anales de la Real Sociedad Española de Química is a peer-reviewed open access scientific journal in chemistry. It is the successor of Anales de Química and has been published by the  Royal Spanish Society of Chemistry (Real Sociedad Española de Química) since 1999.

External links 
 
 Royal Spanish Society of Chemistry

1999 establishments in Spain
Chemistry journals
Spanish-language journals
Quarterly journals
Publications established in 1999
Open access journals